Anand Chandrasekaran is an entrepreneur and business executive from India. He was the former Chief Product officer of Snapdeal and Airtel.

Early life and education
Chandrasekaran did his bachelor's degree in communications engineering from PSG College of Technology. He did his master's in electrical engineering from Stanford University.

Career
Chandrasekaran started his career in 2001 by co-founding Aeroprise. He was the Director of Product at Openwave. In 2011, he joined Yahoo as the senior director of mobile and search, and in 2014 he quit his job from Yahoo. After that he joined as the Chief Product Officer of Bharti Airtel. While being the CPO of Airtel, he launched the Wynk music app. In 2015, he left Bharti airtel and then he joined as the CPO of Snapdeal. In 2016, he resigned from Snapdeal. In 2016, he joined as the Director of Platform Partnerships for Messenger at Facebook. He worked at Facebook for three years and left at 2019. He was the executive vice president of product management at Five9. In 2022, he joined General Catalyst as a partner and investor.

Awards
 Fortune 40 under 40 in 2016
 Young Global Leader in 2010 by World Economic Forum

References

Living people
20th-century Indian businesspeople
Year of birth missing (living people)
Place of birth missing (living people)
Stanford University School of Engineering alumni